Jonathan Alexander Krause (born January 18, 1992) is a former American football wide receiver who is currently the wide receivers coach for the San Diego State Aztecs football team. He played college football at Vanderbilt and attended South Gwinnett High School in Snellville, Georgia. He has played for the Cleveland Browns, New England Patriots, Philadelphia Eagles, Tampa Bay Buccaneers, and Tennessee Titans.

College career 

Part of Coach Bobby Johnson’s final recruiting class at Vanderbilt, Krause was a versatile offensive option for the Commodores. He finished his career with 98 receptions for 1,197 yards. He also scored two rushing touchdowns.

As a senior, Krause enjoyed a career year for the Commodores, bringing tremendous productivity to the receiving corps paced by fellow senior and All-SEC wide receiver Jordan Matthews. He started 11 of 13 games at wide receiver, setting new single-season career highs in virtually every statistical category, including 42 catches, 714 receiving yards and three TDs. Recorded two catches on the game winning drive against Tennessee in the regular season finale. Krause ranked seventh in the SEC with a 64.9-yard receiving average per game.

Serving as the team’s primary punt returner for most of his time in Nashville, Krause tallied a pair of return touchdowns in 2012 which included an 83 yard return at Wake Forest.

Professional career

Cleveland Browns 
On May 12, 2014, the Cleveland Browns signed Krause to their practice squad. Krause was released from the Cleveland Browns' practice squad on August 25, 2014.

New England Patriots 
On October 24, 2014, the New England Patriots signed Krause to their practice squad. Krause won Super Bowl XLIX with the Patriots after they defeated the defending champion Seattle Seahawks 28-24. Krause was released from the New England Patriots' practice squad on August 31, 2015.

Philadelphia Eagles 
On September 22, 2015, the Philadelphia Eagles signed Krause to their practice squad. On November 24, 2015, the Philadelphia Eagles promoted Krause to their 53-man roster.

Tampa Bay Buccaneers
Krause signed with the Buccaneers. On September 3, 2016, he was released by the Buccaneers as part of final roster cuts.

San Diego Chargers
On September 5, 2016, Krause was signed to the Chargers' practice squad. He was released on September 22, 2016.

Second stint with the Buccaneers
On September 28, 2016, Krause was signed to the Buccaneers' practice squad. He was released on October 5, 2016.

Tennessee Titans
On November 1, 2016, Krause was signed to the Titans practice squad. He signed a reserve/future contract with the Titans on January 2, 2017.

On September 2, 2017, Krause was waived by the Titans.

References

External links
NFL Draft Scout
Career transactions 

1992 births
Living people
People from Snellville, Georgia
Sportspeople from the Atlanta metropolitan area
Players of American football from California
Players of American football from Georgia (U.S. state)
American football wide receivers
African-American players of American football
Vanderbilt Commodores football players
Cleveland Browns players
New England Patriots players
Philadelphia Eagles players
Tampa Bay Buccaneers players
San Diego Chargers players
Tennessee Titans players
Coaches of American football from Georgia (U.S. state)
Oregon Ducks football coaches